Estakhr-e Bijar (also Romanized as Estakhr-e Bījār) is a village in Kurka Rural District, in the Central District of Astaneh-ye Ashrafiyeh County, Gilan Province, Iran. At the 2006 census, its population was 839, in 252 families.

References 

Populated places in Astaneh-ye Ashrafiyeh County